Catherine Eddowes (14 April 1842 – 30 September 1888) was the fourth of the canonical five victims of the notorious unidentified serial killer known as Jack the Ripper, who is believed to have killed and mutilated a minimum of five women in the Whitechapel and Spitalfields districts of London from late August to early November 1888.

Eddowes was murdered in the early hours of Sunday 30 September within the City of London. She was the second woman killed within an hour; the night having already seen the murder of Elizabeth Stride within the jurisdiction of the Metropolitan Police. These two murders are commonly referred to as the "double event"; a term which originates from the content of the "Saucy Jacky" postcard received at the Central News Agency on 1 October.

Part of a left human kidney, accompanied by a letter addressed From Hell and postmarked 15 October, was later sent to the chairman of the Whitechapel Vigilance Committee, George Lusk. The author of this letter claimed the section of kidney was from Eddowes, whose left kidney had been removed, and that he had fried and eaten the other half. Most experts, however, do not believe this kidney actually originated from Eddowes's body.

Early life
Catherine Eddowes was born in Graiseley Green, Wolverhampton on 14 April 1842, the sixth of twelve children born to tinplate worker George Eddowes and his wife, Catherine (née Evans), who worked as a cook at the Peacock Hotel.

The family moved to London a year after Eddowes's birth, where her father obtained employment with a firm named Perkins and Sharpus in Bell Court, within the City of London. The family initially resided at 4 Baden Place, Bermondsey, and later relocated to 35 West Street. Here, Eddowes was educated at St. John's Charity School in Potter's Field. By 1851, the family had relocated to 35 West Street. Her mother ultimately bore eleven other children, although only ten of her twelve children survived. She herself died of tuberculosis on 17 November 1855 at the age of 42.

By 1857, both of Eddowes's parents had died, resulting in Eddowes (then aged 15) and three of her siblings being admitted as orphans to a Bermondsey workhouse. All four Eddowes siblings admitted to this workhouse attended a local industrial school in efforts to teach them a trade. Via this initiative, one of Eddowes's older sisters, Emma, and an aunt secured employment for her as a tinplate stamper at the Old Hall Works in Wolverhampton. She relocated to Wolverhampton, residing with her aunt in Bilston Street and working at the Old Hall Works as she continued her education at Dowgate Charity School.

Within months of obtaining this employment, Eddowes was fired from her job, possibly after being caught stealing. The fact Eddowes lost her employment is believed to have caused tensions between her and her aunt, as shortly thereafter, she relocated from Wolverhampton to Birmingham, where she briefly lived with an uncle named Thomas Eddowes, who worked as a shoemaker. Eddowes soon found employment as a tray polisher at a firm in Legge Street in Birmingham, although after approximately four months, she chose to return to Wolverhampton, where she resided with her grandfather, who found work for her as a tinplate stamper. Nine months later, she again moved to Birmingham.

Eddowes was five feet tall, slim, with dark, wavy auburn hair and hazel eyes. Friends later described her as "a very jolly woman, always singing" and an "intelligent and scholarly [individual], but possessed of a fierce temper."

Relationships

Thomas Conway
While residing in Birmingham, Eddowes began a relationship with former soldier Thomas Conway, who had served in the 18th Royal Irish Regiment and who received a small regimental pension. The couple had two children: Catherine Ann (b. 1863); and Thomas Lawrence (b. 1867), and initially supported themselves by selling chapbooks—frequently featuring gallows ballads—penned by Conway and occasionally via labouring work when his health permitted. No evidence exists to support the two having actually married following their initial acquaintance in 1861 or 1862, although shortly after the two began a relationship, Eddowes began referring to herself as "Kate Conway". She later had Conway's initials ("TC") crudely tattooed in blue ink on her left forearm.

Relocation to London
In 1868, Eddowes and Conway moved to London, taking lodgings in Westminster. Their third child and second son was born in 1873. While residing in London, Eddowes took to drinking, which caused rifts within her immediate family. According to later inquest testimony from Eddowes's daughter, Catherine "Annie" Phillips, her parents began living on "bad terms" largely because of her mother's drinking which increased throughout the 1870s and which her father—a teetotaler—found intolerable. By the late 1870s, the quarrels between the two are believed to have become violent, with Eddowes occasionally being seen with black eyes and bruising about her face.

John Kelly
Eddowes left her husband and two youngest children in 1880 (their oldest child had left the household by this date). By the following year, she was living with a new partner, John Kelly; a fruit salesman whom she had met as both lodged at Cooney's common lodging-house at 55 Flower and Dean Street, Spitalfields, at the centre of London's most notorious criminal rookery. Thereafter, she became known to acquaintances as "Kate Kelly". The deputy of this lodging-house, Frederick William Wilkinson, later stated Eddowes seldom drank to excess, although contemporary records indicate she was brought before Thames Magistrates' Court upon a charge of being drunk and disorderly in September 1881. She was discharged without being fined for this offence.

Initially, while living in and around Spitalfields, Eddowes most often earned money by performing domestic work such as cleaning and sewing for the Jewish community in nearby Brick Lane, although she is believed to have also occasionally taken to casual prostitution to pay her daily rent. By the mid 1880s, she and Kelly also earned money by performing seasonal hop-picking work in Kent each summer.

When Eddowes could not afford a bed in a common lodging-house, she typically attempted to borrow money from her sisters or her daughter. She primarily attempted to borrow from her older sister Elizabeth, who lived in Greenwich, and whom she also visited socially on occasion. If unsuccessful in her efforts to borrow money from relatives, she is believed to have slept rough in the front room of 26 Dorset Street, known locally as "the shed".

September 1888
In September 1888, Eddowes and Kelly followed their annual practice of taking casual work hop-picking in the village of Hunton, Kent. En route to Hunton, Eddowes purchased a jacket from a pawnshop and Kelly a pair of boots from a shop in Maidstone. While partaking in this casual work, the two became acquainted with a woman named Emily Birrell and her common-law husband; the four sleeping in the same barn.

At harvest's end, Eddowes and Kelly returned to London on foot with Birrell and her common-law husband, although they parted company midway as Birrell and her partner intended to travel to Cheltenham as opposed to London. Prior to parting company with Birrell, Eddowes was handed a pawn ticket by Birrell, who said to her: "I have got a pawn ticket for a flannel shirt. I wish you'd take it since you're going [to London]. It is only for 9d, and it may fit your old man." Eddowes placed this ticket inside a small mustard tin she carried.

The two reached London on 27 September, spending the night in the casual ward at Shoe Lane in the City of London. The two slept in separate lodging-houses the following evening: Kelly sleeping at 52 Flower and Dean Street; Eddowes at the Mile End Casual Ward. Reportedly, upon her arrival at the casual ward, the superintendent asked Eddowes (who had frequently slept at the premises) where she had recently been, to which Eddowes replied she had been hop-picking. Eddowes then added she intended to claim the reward offered for the arrest of the Whitechapel murderer, adding, "I think I know him."

By the following day, the two had spent almost all their earnings. At 8 a.m. on 29 September, Eddowes and Kelly convened at Cooney's common lodging-house on Flower and Dean Street, where they ate breakfast before purchasing some tea and sugar. The two then agreed to split their last sixpence between them; he took fourpence to pay for a bed in the common lodging-house, and she took twopence, just enough for her to stay a further night at Mile End Casual Ward in the neighbouring parish.

29 September
In the early afternoon of 29 September, Eddowes informed Kelly of her intentions to travel to Bermondsey to attempt to borrow some money from her daughter, who by 1888 had been married to a gun-maker in Southwark for three years. The two parted company in Houndsditch at about 2 p.m., with Eddowes informing Kelly that she expected to return by 4 p.m. With money from pawning his boots, a bare-footed Kelly took a bed at the lodging-house just after 8 p.m., and according to the deputy keeper, he remained there all night.

At 8:30 p.m. on Saturday, 29 September, PC Louis Frederick Robinson observed a small group of people converged outside number 29 Aldgate High Street. Approaching the crowd, he observed Eddowes lying drunk on the pavement. Robinson assisted Eddowes to her feet and leaned her against the shutters of the house, although she rapidly slumped back to the pavement. Summoning the assistance of PC George Simmons, the two took her into custody at Bishopsgate Police Station, to be detained until she was sober enough to leave. Upon arrival, Eddowes gave her name as "Nothing" and within twenty minutes, she had fallen asleep in a cell.

Shortly after 12:30 a.m. on the morning of 30 September, Eddowes asked PC George Hutt when she could be released. In response, Hutt replied: "When you are capable of taking care of yourself." Thirty minutes later, at 1:00 a.m., Eddowes was deemed sober enough to be released, stating to Hutt as he escorted her to the entrance of Bishopsgate Police Station, "All right. Good night, old cock."

Prior to her release, Eddowes gave her name and address to Hutt as "Mary Ann Kelly of 6 Fashion Street".

30 September
Upon leaving the station, instead of turning right to take the shortest route to her Flower and Dean Street lodging-house, Eddowes turned left in the general direction of Aldgate. She was last seen alive in a narrow walkway named Church Passage at 1:35 a.m. by three witnesses: Joseph Lawende; Joseph Hyam Levy; and Harry Harris, who themselves had just left the Imperial Club in Duke's Place on Duke Street.

Lawende later testified Eddowes—wearing a black bonnet and jacket—was standing talking with a man of medium build with a fair moustache at the entrance to Church Passage, which led south-west from Duke Street and into Mitre Square. She was facing the man, with one hand on his chest, although not in a manner to suggest to Lawende she was resisting him. To Lawende, this individual conveyed the overall appearance of a sailor. Lawende walked past the two and did not look back.

Murder
At 1:44 a.m., Eddowes's mutilated and disembowelled body was found lying on her back, with her head resting on a coal hole and turned towards the left shoulder, in the south-west corner of Mitre Square by the square's beat policeman, PC Edward Watkins, approximately fourteen minutes after he had previously passed through the square at 1:30 a.m. Upon discovering Eddowes's body, Watkins called for assistance from the night watchman at the Kearley and Tonge warehouse which bordered Mitre Square: ex-policeman George James Morris. Morris had been sweeping the landings inside the warehouse, with the door to the square open, when Watkins knocked on the door, exclaiming: "For God's sake, mate, come to my assistance!" After viewing the body, he informed Watkins he had noted nothing unusual that evening.

Another watchman based at 5 Mitre Square, George Clapp, and an off-duty policeman who lived at 3 Mitre Square, Richard Pearse, later reported also having seen and heard nothing untoward. Furthermore, another policeman whose beat required his walking close to Mitre Square, PC James Harvey, had also walked down Church Passage from Duke Street very shortly after Watkins had first passed through the square at 1:30 a.m., although his beat took him back down Church Passage and onto Duke Street without actually entering the square. Harvey had also seen nothing out of the ordinary. He was one of the first policeman to arrive at the crime scene in response to Morris's police whistle.

Another policeman to arrive in Mitre Square in response to Morris's whistle, PC Holland, immediately summoned local surgeon George William Sequeira to the scene. Sequeira arrived at the scene at 1:55 a.m. Within minutes, police surgeon Frederick Gordon Brown had also arrived at the crime scene.

Goulston Street graffito
At approximately 2:55 a.m. on 30 September, a blood-stained fragment of Eddowes's apron was discovered at the bottom of a common stairway at a tenement in Goulston Street, Whitechapel by PC Alfred Long. This section of apron was also contaminated with sections of fecal matter, and Long was adamant the garment had not lain in the doorway when he had previously passed this location at 2:20 a.m. Scrawled upon the wall above the section of apron was a crude chalk graffito—the letters measuring approximately three-quarters of an inch—commonly held to have read: "The Juwes are the men that Will not be Blamed for nothing".

The message appeared to imply that a Jew or Jews in general were responsible for the series of murders, although it is unclear whether the graffito was actually written by the murderer upon dropping the section of apron, or was merely present at the location. Anti-semitic graffiti was commonplace in and around Whitechapel. Although the City of London Police believed the graffito should be photographed, fearing potential anti-semitic riots should members of the public view the writing at daybreak, the Metropolitan Police Commissioner, Charles Warren, ordered the graffito washed from the wall at approximately 5 a.m. Nonetheless, the words—including all grammatical errors—were copied before they were washed off the wall.

Post-mortem
The subsequent post-mortem records of Frederick Gordon Brown—who arrived at the crime scene shortly after 2:00 a.m.—state:

Brown conducted the post-mortem upon Eddowes's body that afternoon, noting:

Disputed anatomical knowledge
Although George Bagster Phillips—who had been invited to attend Eddowes's autopsy—agreed with Brown that the degree of anatomical knowledge of the individual who had performed the mutilations and eviscerations upon Eddowes "gave no evidence of anatomical knowledge in the sense that it evidenced the hand of a qualified surgeon", he concurred the perpetrator may have held the degree of knowledge expected of a butcher or slaughterman. However, police physician Thomas Bond disagreed with Brown's assessment of the degree of the perpetrator's anatomical skill. Bond's report to police stated: "In each case the mutilation was inflicted by a person who had no scientific nor anatomical knowledge. In my opinion he does not even possess the technical knowledge of a butcher or horse slaughterer or any person accustomed to cut up dead animals."

George Sequeira, the first doctor at the crime scene, and City medical officer William Sedgwick Saunders, who was also present at the autopsy, also opined that the killer lacked anatomical skill and did not seek particular organs.

Inquest
The official inquest into Eddowes's death was opened in the inquest hall adjacent to the City of London Mortuary on the afternoon of 4 October. This inquest was presided over by the coroner for the City of London, Samuel F. Langham.

The first day of the inquest heard testimony from seven witnesses, including one of Eddowes's sisters, Eliza Gold, who testified she had positively identified the decedent as her sister and that she had last seen Eddowes "three or four weeks" prior to the inquest, when she (Eddowes) had made a point of visiting her when she had been ill.

Character testimony
John Kelly also testified on the first day of the inquest; he also positively identified the decedent as "Catherine Conway", adding he had lived with her for seven years, and he had last seen her alive at "about two o'clock" on 29 September. Kelly also testified Eddowes typically earned her living by hawking goods, that she never lived "by immoral purposes", and that she seldom drank.

Also to testify on the first day of the inquest were the deputy of Cooney's common lodging-house, Frederick Wilkinson, who stated he had known Eddowes for approximately seven years, and that she lived "on good terms" with Kelly. Wilkinson confirmed Eddowes typically returned to the lodging-house in the early evening. His testimony was followed by the policeman who found Eddowes's body, Edward Watkins, who testified his beat typically took "twelve to fourteen minutes" to complete, and that when he had passed through Mitre Square at 1:30 a.m. nothing had been amiss. Watkins then described his actions upon discovering the body fifteen minutes later, and stated he was adamant nothing could have escaped his attention in the square.

Frederick Foster, an architect who had produced a plan of Mitre Square following Eddowes's murder, then testified that an individual could walk from Berner Street (site of the murder of Elizabeth Stride) to Mitre Street in twelve minutes. His testimony was followed by that of an Inspector Collard of the City Police, who described responding to the crime scene, the subsequent actions of police, and his accompanying Drs Sequeira and Brown to the Golden Lane mortuary in the presence of Eddowes's body.

Medical testimony
The final witness to testify on the first day of the inquest was Brown (who also testified on the second day of the inquest). Brown stated his belief that Eddowes had died very quickly as a result of haemorrhaging to her carotid artery resulting from the cut to her throat as she lay on the ground, and that death had occurred thirty to forty minutes prior to his arrival in Mitre Square at about 2:20 a.m. The mutilations to Eddowes's body had all been inflicted with a knife at least six inches in length after death, with the perpetrator most likely kneeling at the right side of Eddowes's body as he inflicted them. Brown further testified the perpetrator "must have had a good deal of knowledge as to the position of the abdominal organs, and the way of removing them."

Following Brown's testimony, proceedings were adjourned until Thursday 11 October. Fifteen witnesses testified on this date, including George Sequeira, who testified to being the first medical individual to arrive at the crime scene. Sequeira corroborated Brown's earlier testimony, although he added his opinion the perpetrator "was not possessed of any great anatomical skill". Sequeira's testimony was followed by that of a medical officer named William Saunders, who testified no trace of poison existed in Eddowes's body.

Further witnesses
Eddowes's daughter, Catherine Phillips, then testified as to the acrimonious relationship between her parents, adding she had not seen her father for over a year, and her mother for two years prior to her murder. Phillips added she had purposely kept her address a secret from her mother due to her frequently "applying for money" from her.

Four police officers then testified in succession. Three of these individuals testified as to their finding the decedent drunk on Aldgate High Street, her being brought to Bishopsgate Police Station, and subsequent release in the early hours of 30 September. Their testimony was followed by that of George Morris, who testified as to being informed by PC Watkins of his discovery in Mitre Square, stating: "The constable said, 'For God's sake, mate, come to my assistance.' I said, 'Stop till I get my lamp. What is the matter?' 'Oh, dear,' he exclaimed, 'here is another woman cut to pieces.'" Morris emphasised he had heard nothing amiss that evening and that, had Eddowes elicited a shout or scream, he would have heard. This testimony was then corroborated by PC James Harvey, who testified that, although his own beat did not take him beyond Church Passage, he had "not seen anyone nor heard a cry" until hearing Morris's police whistle.

Following the testimony of watchman George Clapp and City constable Richard Pearce (who resided at 3 Mitre Square), Joseph Lawende testified to having "observed a man and woman together at the corner of Church Passage ... leading to Mitre Square" approximately "nine or ten feet" from him. Lawende testified he had provided a description of the individual he had seen in Eddowes's company, although he doubted he would be able to recognise this individual again. Lawende's testimony was followed by Joseph Levy, who confirmed the time he, Lawende and Harris had passed the two individuals at the corner of Church Passage, although Levy stated nothing about the two aroused any suspicion within him.

PC Alfred Long then testified to finding a "portion of white apron" at the doorway to numbers 106-119 Goulston Street, and the graffito upon the wall above, which he had noted in his pocket-book. Long stated he had searched the property within minutes of this discovery, finding nothing amiss, before proceeding to the police station, leaving another constable who had arrived at the scene to "keep observation on the dwelling house, and see if any one entered or left."

The final witness to testify, Detective Constable Daniel Halse, testified as to his issuing instructions "for the neighbourhood to be searched and every man stopped and examined" upon learning of Eddowes's murder. Halse also testified that, having proceeded to Goulston Street and viewed the graffito, he had heard gossip among police officers that the word "Juwes" should be erased from the wall and the remainder of the inscription remain, stating: "The fear on the part of the Metropolitan Police [was] that the writing might cause riot was the sole reason why [the graffito] was rubbed out." Halse also testified the graffito—"written with white chalk on a black facia"—was recently inscribed.

Conclusion
The inquest into Eddowes's murder lasted two days, with the final day of hearings having been adjourned until 11 October. Following a short deliberation, the jury, having been instructed to consider precisely how, when, and by what means Eddowes came about her death, returned a verdict of wilful murder against some person unknown. Each of the jurors agreed to present their fees to Eddowes's daughter.

Investigation
Due to the location of Mitre Square, the City of London Police, under the command of Detective Inspector James McWilliam, joined the existing Metropolitan Police manhunt to identify and apprehend the perpetrator. A house-to-house search was conducted by the City Police but nothing suspicious or of use to the enquiry was discovered.

A small mustard tin containing two pawn tickets was discovered among Eddowes's personal possessions. One ticket had been issued on 31 August to one Emily Birell in relation to a flannel shirt; the other to a Church Street pawnbroker named Smith, issued on 29 September, to one Jane Kelly in relation to a pair of boots. Published details of these tickets led to John Kelly identifying the decedent as his common-law wife on 2 October after he read reports pertaining to the pawn tickets and the distinctive tattoo upon the victim's left forearm in the newspapers. His identification was soon confirmed by Catherine Eddowes's older sister, Eliza Gold. No money was found on her. Though the murder occurred within the City of London, it was close to the boundary of Whitechapel where the previous Whitechapel murders had occurred. The mutilation of Eddowes's body and the abstraction of her left kidney and part of her womb by her murderer bore the signature of Jack the Ripper and was very similar in nature to that of earlier victim Annie Chapman.

Mitre Square had three connecting streets: Church Passage to the north-east, Mitre Street to the south-west, and St James's Place to the north-west. As PC Harvey had seen no-one exiting from Church Passage, and PC Watkins saw no-one the square from Mitre Street, the murderer must have left the square northwards through St James's Place towards Goulston Street, where he had dropped the section of Eddowes's blood-stained shawl.

Goulston Street was within a quarter of an hour's walk from Mitre Square, on a direct route to Flower and Dean Street where Eddowes had lodged, indicating that her murderer likely also resided nearby and had headed in the direction of his home after the killing. The graffito found above the shawl may or may not have been related to the murder, but either way it was washed away before dawn on the orders of Metropolitan Police Commissioner Sir Charles Warren, who had feared that, should members of the public see the inscription, anti-Jewish riots may ensue.

Major Henry Smith, acting Commissioner of the City Police, claimed in his memoirs to have discovered bloodied water in a public sink in a court off Dorset Street, and as the water was slowly running out of the basin, he calculated that the Ripper had been there only moments before. Ripper author Martin Fido thought it unlikely that the culprit would wait to wash his hands in a semi-public place about forty minutes after the crime, and Smith's memoirs are both unreliable and embellished for dramatic effect. There is no mention of the sink in the official police reports.

Correspondence

"Saucy Jacky" postcard
On 1 October, a postcard, dubbed the "Saucy Jacky" postcard and signed "Jack the Ripper", was received by the Central News Agency. The author claimed responsibility for the murders of both Stride and Eddowes the previous day, describing the killing of the two women as the "double event"; a designation which has endured. It has been argued that the postcard was mailed before the murders were publicised, making it unlikely that a crank would have such knowledge of the crime, but this correspondence was postmarked more than 24 hours after the killings took place—long after all details were known by journalists and residents of the area.

Police officials later claimed to have identified a London-based journalist as the author of this postcard, which they dismissed as a hoax; an assessment shared by most Ripper historians—many of whom believe that all correspondence received in the manhunt for the Ripper was fabricated by journalists and/or the public in general.

"From Hell" letter
On 16 October 1888, a cubical parcel measuring three-and-a-half inches containing half a preserved human kidney was received by the Chairman of the Whitechapel Vigilance Committee, George Lusk. This parcel was accompanied by a note, known as both the "Lusk letter" and the "From Hell" letter because of the phrase "from hell" used by the writer as the address of origin. The author of this letter claimed to have "fried and ate" the missing kidney half. The handwriting and style were unlike that of the "Saucy Jacky" postcard, as the general linguistic characteristics of this letter indicated the author was either Irish, of Irish extraction, or intentionally intending to mimic Irish pronunciations.

Human kidney
The kidney was taken to Thomas Horrocks Openshaw at the nearby London Hospital. Openshaw believed that the kidney was human, originated from the left side of the body, and that the organ had been preserved in spirits prior to being posted to Lusk on 15 October. The Daily Telegraph reported on 19 October that Openshaw had described the specimen as a recent "ginny kidney" from a 45-year-old female. However, the Star reported the same day that Openshaw denied the report strongly, saying it was impossible to detect the age or gender of the individual whom the kidney had belonged to, or how long the organ had been preserved in spirits.

Major Henry Smith claimed in his memoirs that the kidney received by Lusk matched the one missing from Eddowes, because the length of renal artery attached to the kidney matched the missing length from the body, and both the body and kidney showed signs of Bright's disease. Smith's later recollection does not match the medical reports submitted by the examining pathologists or the police records. Police surgeon Brown said that the kidney had been trimmed up, and that the renal artery was entirely absent. Metropolitan police memos state that the kidney could have come from any body, such as those found in a hospital morgue.

Smith's account is thought by historians to be dramatic licence on his part; the kidney itself could have been sent to Lusk as a medical student's prank. Saunders, who attended Eddowes's post-mortem, later stated to the press, "the right kidney of the woman Eddowes was perfectly normal in its structure and healthy ... my opinion is that it was a student's antic." Chief Inspector Donald Swanson, who co-ordinated the inquiry, wrote: "similar kidneys might and could be obtained from any dead person upon whom a post-mortem had been made for any cause, by students or dissecting room porter."

Funeral
Catherine Eddowes was buried on the afternoon of Monday, 8 October 1888. She was laid to rest in an unmarked public grave at #49336, square 318 in the City of London Cemetery in a service conducted by a Reverend Dunscombe. Her coffin was of polished elm, and bore a plate inscribed with the words "Catherine Eddowes, died Sept. 30, 1888, aged 43 years."

Numerous people lined the streets as the cortège—consisting of an open glass hearse drawn by horses—began the procession from the Golden Lane mortuary to the cemetery at precisely 1:30 p.m. A mourning coach containing John Kelly, four of Eddowes's sisters, and two of her nieces followed the coffin. An estimated 500 people were present as the coffin arrived at the City of London Cemetery prior to interment.

Today, the section of the cemetery where Eddowes was interred has been re-used for part of the Memorial Gardens for cremated remains. Eddowes lies beside the Garden Way in front of Memorial Bed #1849. In late 1996, the cemetery authorities decided to formally mark Eddowes's grave with a plaque.

Later developments
In 2014, mitochondrial DNA matching that of one of Eddowes's descendants was extracted from an 8-foot section of shawl said to have come from the scene of her murder. The actual source of the stains upon the shawl used in the testing could not be definitively classified, although they are hypothesized to source from blood spatter and, in one instance, possibly to semen. The DNA on the shawl believed to originate from traces of semen matched DNA from a descendant of Ripper suspect Aaron Kosminski. This match was also based on a segment of mitochondrial DNA, although no information was given that would enable the commonness of the sequence to be estimated.

The shawl in question is alleged to have been retrieved by a policeman investigating the scene of Eddowes's murder, and subsequently handed down successive family generations before being presented to Scotland Yard's Crime Museum in 1991. Unsure of the garment's authenticity, Scotland Yard never placed the shawl on display within the museum.

The alleged DNA match was based on one of seven small segments taken from the hypervariable regions within the DNA. The segment contained a sequence variation described as 314.1C, and claimed to be uncommon, with a frequency of only one in 290,000 worldwide. However, Professor Sir Alec Jeffreys and others pointed out this was in fact an error in nomenclature for the common sequence variation 315.1C, which is present in more than 99% of the sequences in the EMPOP database.

The owner of the shawl, British author and amateur sleuth Russell Edwards, has since claimed these forensic results prove Kosminski was Jack the Ripper. He is quoted as saying: "Seven years after I bought the shawl, we had nailed Aaron Kosminski." However, other experts strongly disagree. Donald Rumbelow criticized Edwards' claims, saying that no shawl is listed among Eddowes's personal effects by the police, and that the policeman who allegedly retrieved the garment was based in North London in 1888, thus making him unlikely to have been present at any of the crime scenes.

Archaeological geneticists have also stated the forensic techniques utilised in reaching this conclusion are neither new nor scientifically accurate. Mitochondrial DNA expert Peter Gill has also stated the shawl "is of dubious origin and has been handled by several people who could have shared that mitochondrial DNA profile." Two of Eddowes's descendants are also known to have been in the same room as the shawl for three days shortly after Edwards had purchased the garment in 2007. In the words of one critic, "The shawl has been openly handled by loads of people and been touched, breathed on, spat upon. My DNA is probably on there. What's more, Kosminski is likely to have frequented prostitutes in the East End of London. ... If I examined that shawl, I'd probably find links to 150 other men from the area."

Media

Film
 A Study in Terror (1965). This film casts Kay Walsh as Catherine Eddowes.
 Love Lies Bleeding (1999). A drama film directed by William Tannen. Eddowes is portrayed by Elin Spidlová.
 From Hell. (2001). Directed by the Hughes Brothers, the film casts Lesley Sharp as Catherine Eddowes.

Literature
 Begg, Paul (2014). Jack the Ripper: The Forgotten Victims. London: Yale University Press. 
 Evans, Stewart P.; Skinner, Keith (2001). Jack the Ripper: Letters from Hell. Stroud, Gloucestershire: Sutton Publishing.

Television
 Jack the Ripper (1973). A six-part BBC television drama series. This series casts Hilary Sesta as Catherine Eddowes.
 Jack the Ripper (1988). A Thames Television film drama series starring Michael Caine. Catherine Eddowes is played by actress Susan George.
 The Real Jack the Ripper (2010). Directed by David Mortin, this series casts Sarah Williamson as Catherine Eddowes and was first broadcast on 31 August 2010.
 Jack the Ripper: The Definitive Story (2011). A two-hour documentary which references original police reports and eyewitness accounts pertaining to the Whitechapel Murderer. Eddowes is portrayed by Caroline Waite.

Drama
 Jack, the Last Victim (2005). This musical casts Janet Wheeler as Catherine Eddowes.

See also
 Cold case
 List of serial killers before 1900
 Unsolved murders in the United Kingdom

Notes

References

Bibliography
 Beadle, William (2009) Jack the Ripper: Unmasked, London: John Blake. 
 Begg, Paul (2003). Jack the Ripper: The Definitive History. London: Pearson Education. 
 Begg, Paul (2006). Jack the Ripper: The Facts. Anova Books. 
 Bell, Neil R. A. (2016). Capturing Jack the Ripper: In the Boots of a Bobby in Victorian England. Stroud: Amberley Publishing. 
 Cook, Andrew (2009). Jack the Ripper. Stroud, Gloucestershire: Amberley Publishing. 
 Eddleston, John J. (2002). Jack the Ripper: An Encyclopedia. London: Metro Books. 
 Edwards, Russell (2014). Naming Jack the Ripper: New Crime Scene Evidence, A Stunning Forensic Breakthrough. London: Sidgwick and Jackson. 
 Evans, Stewart P.; Rumbelow, Donald (2006). Jack the Ripper: Scotland Yard Investigates. Stroud, Gloucestershire: Sutton Publishing. 
 Evans, Stewart P.; Skinner, Keith (2000). The Ultimate Jack the Ripper Sourcebook: An Illustrated Encyclopedia. London: Constable and Robinson. 
 Fido, Martin (1987). The Crimes, Death and Detection of Jack the Ripper. Vermont: Trafalgar Square. 
 Gordon, R. Michael (2000). Alias Jack the Ripper: Beyond the Usual Whitechapel Suspects. North Carolina: McFarland Publishing. 
 Harris, Melvin (1994). The True Face of Jack the Ripper. London: Michael O'Mara Books Ltd. 
 Holmes, Ronald M.; Holmes, Stephen T. (2002). Profiling Violent Crimes: An Investigative Tool. Thousand Oaks, California: Sage Publications, Inc. 
 Honeycombe, Gordon (1982). The Murders of the Black Museum: 1870-1970. London: Bloomsbury Books. 
 Lynch, Terry; Davies, David (2008). Jack the Ripper: The Whitechapel Murderer. Hertfordshire: Wordsworth Editions. 
 Marriott, Trevor (2005). Jack the Ripper: The 21st Century Investigation. London: John Blake. 
 Rumbelow, Donald (2004). The Complete Jack the Ripper. Fully Revised and Updated. London: Penguin Books. 
 Waddell, Bill (1993). The Black Museum: New Scotland Yard. London: Little, Brown and Company. 
 White, Jerry (2007). London in the Nineteenth Century. London: Jonathan Cape. 
 Whitehead, Mark; Rivett, Miriam (2006). Jack the Ripper. Harpenden, Hertfordshire: Pocket Essentials. 
 Whittington-Egan, Richard; Whittington-Egan, Molly (1992). The Murder Almanac. Glasgow: Neil Wilson Publishing. 
 Whittington-Egan, Richard (2013). Jack the Ripper: The Definitive Casebook. Stroud: Amberley Publishing. 
 Wilson, Colin; Odell, Robin (1987) Jack the Ripper: Summing Up and Verdict. Bantam Press.

External links

 Contemporary news article pertaining to the murder of Catherine Eddowes
 Contemporary news article relating to the inquest into Eddowes's death
 1 October 1888 Times news article pertaining to the "double event" murders of Elizabeth Stride and Catherine Eddowes
 Casebook: Jack the Ripper
 The Whitechapel Murder Victims: Catherine Eddowes at whitechapeljack.com

1842 births
1880s murders in London
1888 deaths
1888 in London
1888 murders in the United Kingdom
19th-century English women
English female prostitutes
English murder victims
Female murder victims
Jack the Ripper victims
People from Wolverhampton
People of the Victorian era
September 1888 events